General Sir John Bloomfield  (c. 1793 – 1 August 1880) was Master Gunner, St James's Park, the most senior Ceremonial Post in the Royal Artillery after the Sovereign.

Military career
Bloomfield was commissioned into the Royal Artillery in 1810 and rose through the officer ranks to become a Lieutenant-General in 1866.

He was made Colonel Commandant of the Royal Artillery in 1866 and promoted to full General in 1876 and then held the position of Master Gunner, St James's Park from 1877. He died in 1880.

References

1880 deaths
British Army generals
Royal Artillery officers
Knights Grand Cross of the Order of the Bath
1793 births